Noble House may refer to:

Noble house (term) or dynasty, a noble or aristocratic family of high social status or rank

Arts, entertainment, and media
Noble House (novel), a 1981 book by James Clavell
Noble House (miniseries), a 1988 TV series based on the book
Noble House Film & Television Inc., a film production company

Places in the United States
Noble House (Norfolk, Connecticut), NRHP-listed in Litchfield County
Alexander Noble House, Fish Creek, Wisconsin, NRHP-listed in Door County
Chapman-Noble House, Wichita, Kansas, NRHP-listed in Sedgwick County
John Glover Noble House, New Milford, Connecticut, NRHP-listed in Litchfield County
Jonathan Noble House, Columbus, Ohio, NRHP-listed in Columbus
Kellum-Noble House, Houston, Texas, NRHP-listed in Harris County
Lewis Noble House, Worthington, Ohio, NRHP-listed in Franklin County
Noble Block, Augusta, Maine, NRHP-listed in Kennebec County
Noble Cottage, Anniston, Alabama, listed on the National Register of Historic Places (NRHP) in Calhoun County
Noble County Sheriff's House and Jail, Albion, Indiana, NRHP-listed
Noble County Jail and Sheriff's Office, Caldwell, Ohio, NRHP-listed in Noble County
Noble-Kendall House, Albia, Iowa, NRHP-listed in Monroe County
Noble-McCaa-Butler House, Anniston, Alabama, NRHP-listed in Calhoun County
Noble–Seymour–Crippen House, Chicago, Illinois, NRHP-listed
The Island House, Elk Rapids, Michigan (sometimes referred to as the Edwin Noble House)

See also
List of noble houses
Manor house
Mansion
Noble Hotel, an historic site in Watonga, Oklahoma
Samuel Noble Monument, an historic site in Anniston, Alabama